The 5th Ohio Infantry Regiment was an infantry regiment from southwestern Ohio that served in the Union Army during the American Civil War, serving in both the Eastern and Western Theaters in a series of campaigns and battles. It was noted for its holding the high ground at the center of the line at Antietam as part of Tyndale's 1st Brigade, Greene's 2nd Division of Mansfield's XII Corps.

Organization and service
The 5th Ohio Infantry Regiment was organized at Camp Harrison near Cincinnati on 20 April 1861, for three months service. The men were mustered into service on 8 May. The regiment moved to Camp Dennison on 23 May, and was on duty there until 20 June.

After its initial term of enlistment expired, the regiment was reorganized on 20 June 1861, for three years, under Colonel Samuel H. Dunning. The remaining three-months men who did not re-enlist in the new regiment were mustered out on 24 July.

The regiment served in western Virginia for most of the balance of the year. In 1862, the regiment was sent into Virginia's Shenandoah Valley, where it suffered significant casualties during First Battle of Kernstown in March. At the subsequent Battle of Port Republic on 9 June, the Buckeyes lost 244 killed, wounded and prisoners. Its ranks much depleted from the Valley Campaign, the regiment served in the defenses of Washington, D.C. under John Pope and participated in the Northern Virginia Campaign.

The 5th Ohio Infantry was heavily involved in the fighting at the Battle of Antietam on 17 September 1862. It was part of Major General Joseph Mansfield's XII Corps and Lt. Col. Hector Tyndale's Brigade, along with the 7th Ohio Infantry, 66th Ohio Infantry, and 28th Pennsylvania Infantry Regiments. Entering the battle in support of Joseph Hooker's I Corps, Tyndale's brigade inflicted heavy casualties on Alfred H. Colquitt's brigade and helped drive the Confederates out of the Cornfield. Pushing the Confederates south to the Dunker Church, Tyndale's men held the area until the afternoon when lack of support, heavy losses and low ammunition compelled them to retreat.

In 1863, the partially replenished 5th Ohio Infantry fought in the Army of the Potomac at Chancellorsville and then served in the Gettysburg Campaign. Transferred later in the summer to the Western Theater and becoming part of the XX Corps under Joseph Hooker, the regiment participated in the Battle of Lookout Mountain near Chattanooga, Tennessee.

The following year, the regiment served in the forces under William T. Sherman in the Atlanta Campaign and was part of Sherman's March to the Sea and the subsequent operations against Confederate-held Savannah, Georgia. In the spring of 1865, the regiment served in the Carolinas Campaign.

During the Civil War, the 5th Ohio Infantry participated in 28 battles and sustained a loss of more than 500 men killed, wounded and prisoners.

See also

Ohio in the Civil War

Notes

References
 
 
 Dyer, Frederick Henry, A Compendium of the War of the Rebellion. 3 volumes. New York: T. Yoseloff, 1908.
Reid, Whitelaw, Ohio in the War: Her Statesmen, Her Generals, and Soldiers. Volume 2. Cincinnati: Moore, Wilstach, & Baldwin, 1868.

Further reading
 Ohio Roster Commission. Official Roster of the Soldiers of the State of Ohio in the War on the Rebellion, 1861–1865, compiled under the direction of the Roster commission. 12 vol. Akron: Werner Co., 1886–95.

External links
 Larry Stevens' 5th OVI Page
 5th Ohio reenactor group 
 Ohio Historical Society: Battleflags and Relics
 National Park Service: Civil War Soldiers and Sailors System
 Civil War Index: 5th Ohio Infantry – 3 Months Service in the American Civil War
 Civil War Index: 5th Ohio Infantry – 3 Years Service in the American Civil War

Units and formations of the Union Army from Ohio
Cincinnati in the American Civil War
1861 establishments in Ohio
Military units and formations established in 1861
Military units and formations disestablished in 1865